Dong Haichuan (13 October 1797 or 1813 – 25 October 1882) is regarded as a skillful martial artist and is widely credited to be the founder of Baguazhang. Most, if not all, existing schools of Baguazhang place Dong Haichuan at the beginning of their lineage. Some traditional teachers in China do not regard Dong as the founder, though, but merely as the first identified transmitter of Baguazhang knowledge to the wider public. In their opinion, prior to Dong, Baguazhang teaching was conducted behind closed doors from one Taoist to another within the Taoist sect. There are no historical evidence of practicing Baguazhang among the Taoists prior to the modern era, however.

Biography
He was born on 13 October 1797 or 1813 in Zhu village, Ju Jia Wu Township, Wen'an County, Hebei Province, China. As a child and young man he intensely trained in the martial arts of his village. The arts were probably Shaolin-based and may have included Bafanshan (a possible precursor to Fanziquan), Hongquan, Xingmenquan, and Jingangquan. These were the arts being taught in and around Dong's village at this time. Alternatively, Dong is sometimes said to have learned and practiced Erlangquan, Luohanquan, or other arts.

His family is thought to have been so poor, at some point around 1853, Dong left Hebei Province to seek work elsewhere. By many accounts he is described as spending his youth travelling, penniless, and often getting in trouble. But he, even by his own claims, continued to study martial arts intensely during his travels. Where, by whom, and what he was taught, varies depending on the source. But it is generally accepted that, during this time, Dong studied Taoist training methods that included some kind of circle walking practice. He synthesized his previous experience with his village arts, what he had learned in his travels, and his Taoist studies to create a unique art originally called Zhuanzhang (Turning Palms). Zhuanzhang in later years became called Baguazhang.

Around 1864 Dong arrived in Beijing and was hired as a servant at the residence of the Prince Su. Later Prince Su gave him the job of tax collector. Dong and his top student Yin Fu went to Mongolia to collect taxes, where he spent ten years. Upon his return he left the prince's employ and began to teach publicly, giving up all other occupations to fully devote himself to developing and teaching Baguazhang.

The nature of what he taught is generally disputed. Some believe that he consistently taught only the first three of eight palms (Single Change Palm, Double Change Palm and Smooth Body Palm) and that he would vary the last five depending on the individuals' previous martial arts experience. Others believe that he taught considerably more material. It was also in his public teaching period that the art was given the name Baguazhang (Eight tri-gram palm). Baguazhang became popular in Beijing and surrounding areas.

In his later years he was poor and lived with Yin Fu's student Ma Gui. Ma owned a lumber yard and Dong lived on the premises. He died on 25 October 1882 in Beijing.

By the late 19th century, Baguazhang had become a well-known fighting style in Beijing and northern China, and Dong Haichuan and his students became famous. This gave rise to many fictitious stories and written pulp novels which were adopted as fact.

Students
Dong taught Baguazhang to several highly regarded martial artists, notably Fu Zhensong, Yin Fu, Ma Gui, Cheng Tinghua and Liang Zhenpu. Some of these students' names are recorded on his grave.

Bibliography
 Smith, Robert W. "Chinese Boxing", 
 Liang, Shou-Yu; Yang, Jwing-Ming; Wu, Wen-Ching "Baguazhang : Emei Baguazhang Theory and Applications", pp 36–38, 
 Smith, Robert W.; Pittman, Allen "Pa-Kua – Eight Trigram Boxing" pp 19–22,

See also
Baguazhang
Neijia
Neigong
Neijin
Chinese martial arts
Liang Zhenpu
Li Ziming
Sui Yunjiang

References

External links
The Yin and Yang of Ba Gua Zhang: The Legends of Thin Yin and Spectacles Cheng by Frank Allen & Clarence Lu

1797 births
1882 deaths
Chinese baguazhang practitioners
Martial arts school founders
People from Langfang
Qing dynasty Taoists
Sportspeople from Hebei